is a Japanese stuntman and suit actor.

TV 
1982: Dai Sentai Goggle V - Ninja Officer
1983: Kagaku Sentai Dynaman
1985: Dengeki Sentai Changeman - Navigator Gaata / Officer Watanabe
1986: Choushinsei Flashman - Kerao 
1987: Hikari Sentai Maskman
1987: Kamen Rider Black
1988: Kamen Rider Black RX - Fanged Captain Gedorian
1991: Choujin Sentai Jetman - Neo Jetman 3 
1992: Kyōryū Sentai Zyuranger - Bookback
1993: Gosei Sentai Dairanger - KibaRanger
1997: B-Robo Kabutack
2013: Kamen Rider Wizard - Raum / Kaga

Films 
2000: Godzilla vs. Megaguirus - Megaguirus

External links 
 

Japanese male film actors
1962 births
Living people